The New York City Subway is a rapid transit system that serves four of the five boroughs of New York City in the U.S. state of New York: the Bronx, Brooklyn, Manhattan, and Queens. Its predecessors—the Interborough Rapid Transit Company (IRT), the Brooklyn–Manhattan Transit Corporation (BMT), and the Independent Subway System (IND)—were consolidated in 1940. Since then, stations of the New York City Subway have been permanently closed, either entirely or in part.

The largest number of closed New York City Subway stations consist of stations on abandoned and demolished elevated lines, that were once operated by the IRT and the BMT, (both of which were privately held companies.) After their takeover by the City of New York (the IND was already owned and operated by New York City), the three former systems were no longer in competition with each other. Thus, elevated lines that duplicated underground lines were the first to close. Other elevated lines that did not create a redundancy in the system, such as the Bronx portion of the IRT Third Avenue Line and a major portion of the BMT Myrtle Avenue Line were later demolished. Two stations in which sections of track still operate have been demolished. The Dean Street station was demolished as part of the rebuilding of the BMT Franklin Avenue Line, and the Cortlandt Street station of the IRT Broadway–Seventh Avenue Line was demolished and subsequently rebuilt after it sustained heavy damage caused by the September 11 attacks.

The remaining closed stations and portions of stations are intact and are abandoned. The exception is the Court Street station: it is the site of the New York Transit Museum, a museum that documents the history of public transportation in New York City. The closed outer platforms of the Hoyt–Schermerhorn Streets station are occasionally used for filming purposes. The criterion for closing stations, as explained by spokesman Charles Seaton, is not "because of low ridership. The only reason we have closed a station is because of its proximity to another station... The smaller stations are just as necessary as the larger ones."

Permanently closed but existing stations

These stations are still intact but are not currently served by passenger trains. This list does not include closed platforms on a different level of an open station.

Open stations with closed platforms or entrances

Closed platforms
These stations are currently in operation, but contain abandoned platforms either adjacent to or on another level from the open platforms. The entries under the "Line" column refer to the line in question, even if the line is defunct. The entries under the "Opened" and "Closed" columns refer to the platform in question.

Closed entrances
In response to a request made by State Senator Martin Dilan, the Metropolitan Transportation Authority (MTA) stated that 119 stations either had a closed street stair or closed control area, and that 130 stations had closed entrances. Within these 130 stations, there are 114 closed control areas and 298 closed street stairs. 188 of these were connected to closed control areas, with the remainder connected to control areas that remain open. Of these, many entrances were closed between the 1970s and 1990s due to legitimate crime concerns, due to low ridership, and to cut costs. As crime has decreased, and as ridership has gone up, these entrances, for the most part have not been revisited. During some station renovation projects, closed entrances have been reopened. New York City Comptroller Scott Stringer delivered a letter to the New York City Transit Authority President Andy Byford in January 2020, demanding that the MTA develop, and make public, plans for restoring abundance of unavailable entryways along subway routes. The "long-shuttered entry points" contribute to severe overcrowding at stations and longer commute times.

Unfinished stations
These stations saw some construction but were left unfinished. The entries under the "Station" column refer to the station in which the unfinished station was built around.

Demolished stations
These stations have been demolished, with little or no infrastructure in existence. This list only includes stations demolished on existing lines; for lines that have been demolished, see defunct lines.

Reopened and temporarily closed stations
These are stations that were officially closed and then reopened after at least one year. This list does not include stations that were closed for less than one year due to planned rehabilitation of the line or station.

In addition to the Cortlandt Street stations below, a number of stations were closed in Lower Manhattan in the aftermath of the September 11, 2001 attacks. See Closings and cancellations following the September 11 attacks.

For reconstruction
The following stations were totally rebuilt due to unplanned causes.

For renovation 
The following stations were completely closed for more than a year while they were being renovated.

For other reasons 
The following stations were closed for a significant amount of time, but were not rebuilt during that time.

See also

History of the New York City Subway
New York City Subway nomenclature
Ghost station

References

Further reading

 

New York City Subway closed
Sub
New York City-related lists